The 2015–16 ISU Speed Skating World Cup, officially the ISU World Cup Speed Skating 2015–2016, was a series of international speed skating competitions that ran the entire season. The season started on 13 November 2015 in Calgary, Alberta, Canada, and ended with the final on 13 March 2016 in Heerenveen, Netherlands.

In total, six competition weekends were held at five different locations, 18 cups were contested (nine for men, and nine for women), and 88 races took place. Additionally, there were two Grand World Cups, one for men and one for women, in which all individual races, regardless of distance, counted.

The World Cup is organized by the International Skating Union (ISU).

Calendar
The detailed schedule for the season.

Note: the men's 5000 and 10000 metres were contested as one cup, and the women's 3000 and 5000 metres were contested as one cup, as indicated by the color coding.

In addition, there were two combination cups, the allround combination and the sprint combination. For the allround combination, the distances were 1500 + 5000 metres for men, and 1500 + 3000 metres for women. For the sprint combination, the distances were 500 + 1000 metres, both for men and women. These cups were contested only in World Cup 5, in Stavanger, Norway.

Entry rules

Qualification criteria

In order to qualify, skaters had to achieve the following results in ISU events, international competitions or national championships between 1 July 2014 and the entry deadline for the competition concerned.

 in the Olympic Oval, Calgary, or the Utah Olympic Oval, Salt Lake City
 in other ice rinks
 or 6:35.00 on 5000 m
 or 6:40.00 on 5000 m
 or 4:15.00 on 3000 m
 or 4:20.00 on 3000 m

For the mass start and team pursuit events, skaters who had achieved any one of the above results were qualified. However, every ISU member nation was allowed to enter a maximum of one skater per gender who had not achieved any of these results, provided that they had achieved a 1500 m result of 1:57.50 (men) or 2:10.00 (women).

World records

World records going into the 2015–16 season.

Men

{| class="wikitable" border="1" style="text-align:center"
|-
! Distance
! Time
! Holder(s)
! Nat.
! Date
! Venue
! Reference
|-
| 500 m
| 34.03
| align=left | Jeremy Wotherspoon
| 
| align=right | 9 November 2007
| align=left | Utah Olympic Oval, Salt Lake City
| 
|-
| 1000 m
| 1:06.42
| align=left | Shani Davis
| 
| align=right | 7 March 2009
| align=left | Utah Olympic Oval, Salt Lake City
| 
|-
| 1500 m
| 1:41.04
| align=left | Shani Davis
| 
| align=right | 11 December 2009
| align=left | Utah Olympic Oval, Salt Lake City
| 
|-
| 5000 m
| 6:03.32
| align=left | Sven Kramer
| 
| align=right | 17 November 2007
| align=left | Olympic Oval, Calgary
| 
|-
| 10000 m
| 12:41.69
| align=left | Sven Kramer
| 
| align=right | 10 March 2007
| align=left | Utah Olympic Oval, Salt Lake City
| 
|-
| Team pursuit  (8 laps)
| 3:35.60
| align=left | Koen Verweij  Jan Blokhuijsen  Sven Kramer
| 
| align=right | 16 November 2013
| align=left | Utah Olympic Oval, Salt Lake City
| 
|}

Women

{| class="wikitable" border="1" style="text-align:center"
|-
! Distance
! Time
! Holder(s)
! Nat.
! Date
! Venue
! Reference
|-
| 500 m
| 36.36
| align=left | Lee Sang-hwa
| 
| align=right | 16 November 2013
| align=left | Utah Olympic Oval, Salt Lake City
| 
|-
| 1000 m
| 1:12.58
| align=left | Brittany Bowe
| 
| align=right | 17 November 2013
| align=left | Utah Olympic Oval, Salt Lake City
| 
|-
| 1500 m
| 1:51.79
| align=left | Cindy Klassen
| 
| align=right | 20 November 2005
| align=left | Utah Olympic Oval, Salt Lake City
| 
|-
| 3000 m
| 3:53.34
| align=left | Cindy Klassen
| 
| align=right | 18 March 2006
| align=left | Olympic Oval, Calgary
| 
|-
| 5000 m
| 6:42.66
| align=left | Martina Sáblíková
| 
| align=right | 18 February 2011
| align=left | Utah Olympic Oval, Salt Lake City
| 
|-
| Team pursuit  (6 laps)
| 2:55.79
| align=left | Kristina Groves  Christine Nesbitt  Brittany Schussler
| 
| align=right | 6 December 2009
| align=left | Olympic Oval, Calgary
| 
|}
 New records :
500 m  Pavel Kulizhnikov
1000 m (lowland)  Pavel Kulizhnikov
1500  Heather Richardson-Bergsma
1000 m  Brittany Bowe
10.000 m  Ted-Jan Bloemen

Men's standings

500 m

1000 m

1500 m

5000 and 10000 m

Mass start

Team pursuit

Team sprint

Grand World Cup

Women's standings

500 m

1000 m

1500 m

3000 and 5000 m

Mass start

Team pursuit

Team sprint

Grand World Cup

References

External links 
International Skating Union

Results at ISUresults.eu

 
15-16
Isu Speed Skating World Cup, 2015-16
Isu Speed Skating World Cup, 2015-16